Talpur is a Saraiki-speaking Baloch sub-clan of the Hoth tribe settled in Sindh, Punjab and Balochistan in Pakistan. The tribe established the Talpur dynasty, which ruled between 1783 and 1843, while a branch of the dynasty ruled until 1955 as the Khairpur princely state.

See also
Mir
Bhurgri

References

Baloch people
Baloch tribes
History of Sindh
Talpur dynasty